Terry St. Louis (born 23 December 1969) is a Trinidadian former footballer who played in the TT Pro League, and the USL A-League.

Playing career     
St. Louis began his playing career in his native country with San Juan Jabloteh F.C. in 1995. In 1997, he went abroad to the United States to sign with the Charleston Battery of the USL A-League. With Charleston he scored two goals in seven games, before transferring to the Toronto Lynx. During his tenure with Toronto, he appeared in 10 matches and scored 3 goals, and assisted the club in qualifying for the post season for the first time in the franchise's history by finishing 4th in the Northeastern division. In the playoffs, he scored the lone goal for the Lynx against the Montreal Impact (1992–2011) in the first round match, but ultimately the club was eliminated from the postseason. He returned to Toronto the following season, but was released midway through the season after appearing in eights games and failing to score any goals.

He returned to Trinidad and Tobago and signed with Joe Public F.C. in 1999. He returned to Canada and signed with the Vancouver 86ers making his debut on April 27, 2001 in a match against the MLS Pro-40. With the Whitecaps he secured a playoff berth with the club by clinching their division, but were defeated by the Hershey Wildcats in the semi-finals.

International  career  
St. Louis played for the Trinidad and Tobago national football team appearing in 11 matches and scoring 3 goals. He won the 1995 Caribbean Cup and scoring a goal in the final match against the Saint Vincent and the Grenadines which resulted in a 5-0 victory. He also featured in the 1996 CONCACAF Gold Cup tournament.

Honors

Trinidad and Tobago 
 Caribbean Cup (1): 1995 Caribbean Cup

References 

1969 births
Living people
Trinidad and Tobago footballers
Trinidad and Tobago international footballers
Charleston Battery players
San Juan Jabloteh F.C. players
Joe Public F.C. players
Toronto Lynx players
A-League (1995–2004) players
Vancouver Whitecaps (1986–2010) players
TT Pro League players
Association football forwards
1996 CONCACAF Gold Cup players